Jamie Bain (born 6 August 1991) is a Scottish footballer who plays for Brechin City, as a defender, Full back.

Career statistics

References

1991 births
Living people
Scottish footballers
Airdrieonians F.C. players
Forfar Athletic F.C. players
Scottish Football League players
Scottish Professional Football League players
Association football midfielders
Clyde F.C. players